Earles may refer to:
Earles, Kentucky
Betty Earles, a boat built in 1913

People with the name Earles
H. Clay Earles (1913-1999), American NASCAR promoter
Jason Earles (born 1977), American actor
Pat Earles (born 1955), English footballer

See also
Earl (disambiguation)
Earle (disambiguation)
Earle's Shipbuilding